Marlene Catalina Herrera Díaz (born 30 April 1951) is a Mexican politician affiliated with the Institutional Revolutionary Party. As of 2014 she served as Senator of the LIX Legislature of the Mexican Congress  representing Chiapas as replacement of José Antonio Aguilar Bodegas and as Deputy of the LV and LVII Legislatures.

References

1951 births
Living people
People from Tuxtla Gutiérrez
Women members of the Senate of the Republic (Mexico)
Members of the Senate of the Republic (Mexico)
Members of the Chamber of Deputies (Mexico)
Institutional Revolutionary Party politicians
Women members of the Chamber of Deputies (Mexico)
Politicians from Chiapas
National Autonomous University of Mexico alumni
20th-century Mexican politicians
20th-century Mexican women politicians